Zahn um Zahn – Die Praktiken des Dr. Wittkugel (Tooth for a Tooth: The Practices of Dr. Wittkugel) was an East German television series broadcast between 1985 and 1988. It starred Alfred Struwe as the East Berlin-based dentist Dr. Alexander Wittkugel and Helga Piur as his receptionist Victoria "Häppchen" Happmeyer.

See also
List of German television series

External links
 

German medical television series
1985 German television series debuts
1988 German television series endings
Television shows set in Berlin
Television in East Germany
German-language television shows